Edward (Ted) Pretty (born 1957, Darwin, NT, Australia), is an Australian businessman and lawyer.

Education
Pretty obtained a bachelor's degree in Arts (Economics) and First Class Honors Degree in Law.

Career

Early career 
Pretty was a Partner at Media and Telecommunications Law Firm, Gilbert & Tobin.  From there, he moved to Optus, serving as an adviser and director of Optus Communications and Optus Vision.

Telstra 
In October 1997 Pretty was appointed managing director, International of Australia's public and largest telecommunications company Telstra.

During his time at Telstra, Pretty served in a number of roles, including head of Telstra's Convergent Business Group, and the head of Telstra Retail. and in 2003 he became group managing director of the Telstra Technology, Innovation and Products Group.

During his tenure at Telstra, Pretty oversaw the entry and early steps of the company in internet and online business. before resigning from Telstra in 2005.

Macquarie group 
In 2006, Pretty became a consultant at Macquarie Group, and continued on with the company to become executive director of Macquarie Capital. He was instrumental in Macquarie's bid to build the National Broadband Network.

Gulf finance house 
Pretty joined Gulf Finance House as CEO of Investment Capital and in December 2009, was appointed Group chief executive officer.

Hills Limited 
On 3 September 2012, Pretty was confirmed as the group managing director of Hills Limited in association with a major restructure of the company.  Pretty oversaw its transformation.

With a number of South Australian universities and the SA Government and Premier Jay Weatherill, Pretty established two centres in Adelaide to foster innovation and support start-up companies.

On 27 May 2015, Pretty resigned from his position as group managing director and chief executive officer.

Covata and Cipherpoint Limited 
On 23 December 2016, Pretty was confirmed as the managing director and CEO of Covata Limited. Later on Covata was renamed to Cipherpoint Limited and altered governance structure. Pretty moved to a part-time executive chair role.

Directorships 
Pretty was a director of ASX Listed NextDC Limited and was Advisory chairman, Australia and New Zealand of Indian IT company Tech Mahindra Group.

He was chairman and on the Board of ASX listed RP Data Limited for 8 years. He was chairman, Fujitsu Australia and NZ.
Investments. Pretty is a co investor, shareholder and director of Bevan Slattery's undersea cable company SubPartners.

Australian governmental advisory roles 
Pretty is on The Ministerial Advisory Council on Communications for the Honorable Malcolm Turnbull MP, then Minister for Communications.

He advised on the "E-commerce expert group" set up by the then Minister for Financial Services and Regulation, the Honorable Joe Hockey and served as one of the "Members of Foreign Affairs, Trade and Cultural Councils"

References 

1957 births
Australian business executives
Living people